Rong Zhixing or Rong Zhihang (born 30 July 1948) is a retired Chinese footballer who played for Guangdong. He represented China PR in the 1976 Asian Cup and qualifying for the 1982 FIFA World Cup .

Biography
Rong was born in a ship on the journey from China to India, his family came from Taishan, Guangdong. His family lived in India until 1953, when they returned to China and settled in Guangzhou. Rong started his career playing for the Guangzhou youth football team, after that he was elected to the Guangzhou worker football team. In 1966 Rong join Guangzhou football team. In 1969, Rong was elected to the Guangdong football team, he was called up to the Chinese national team and played in the 1976 Asian Cup, with China earning third place. Rong was still called up to represent China as he played within the 1980 Asian Cup and qualifying for the 1982 FIFA World Cup. After China lost to New Zealand in qualifying for the 1982 FIFA World Cup, Rong retired.

In 1982, Rong retired and studied in university, he worked as the coach of  Guangdong youth football team for a short time. After that Rong worked as the vice secretary of party committee of  Guangdong province sports technical college. In 1991, Rong worked as the director of the Shenzhen sports committee.

On January 21,2014, Rong was elected vice chairman of the Chinese Football Association.

Career statistics

International

International goals
Scores and results list China's goal tally first.

Honours

Player
Guangdong FC
China national league: 1979

References

External links
Team China Stats

1948 births
Living people
Chinese footballers
Association football midfielders
Guangdong Winnerway F.C. players
Guangzhou F.C. players
1976 AFC Asian Cup players
China international footballers
Footballers from Jiangmen
People from Taishan, Guangdong
Footballers at the 1974 Asian Games
Medalists at the 1978 Asian Games
Footballers at the 1978 Asian Games
Asian Games bronze medalists for China
Asian Games medalists in football